Omar Ali Saifuddin is the name of three Sultans of Brunei:
 Omar Ali Saifuddin I (reigned 1762-1795)
 Omar Ali Saifuddin II (reigned 1829-1852)
 Omar Ali Saifuddien III (reigned 1950-1967)